List of architects involved in the Gothic Revival.

Truman O. Angell
John Lee Archer
James Piers St Aubyn
Hubert Austin
William Swinden Barber
James Oscar Betelle
Edmund Blacket
George Frederick Bodley
Giuseppe Bonavia
Stephen Dykes Bower 
Arthur Bown
Henry Edwin Bown
David Bryce
William Burges
William Butterfield
Richard Carpenter
Richard Cromwell Carpenter
Frederick Codd
Sir Ninian Comper 
Cope & Stewardson
Ralph Adams Cram
Charles Amos Cummings
Pierre Cuypers 
Alexander Jackson Davis
Louis Delacenserie
John Douglas
Andrew Jackson Downing
Benjamin Ferrey
Watson Fothergill
Thomas Fuller
Frank Furness
Emanuele Luigi Galizia
Thomas Garner
John Gibbs
Bertram Goodhue
Francis Goodwin 
Charles Francis Hansom
Joseph Hansom
James Harrison
Otto Pius Hippius
Edmund Kirby
Charles Klauder
Charles Donagh Maginnis
Sanderson Miller
Josef Mocker
Benjamin Mountfort
John Notman
Edward Graham Paley
Henry Paley
John Loughborough Pearson
Frederick Thomas Pilkington
William Pitt
Demetri Porphyrios
George Fellowes Prynne 
Augustus Pugin
James Renwick Jr.
Thomas Rickman
James Gamble Rogers
Thomas Rowe
Robert Lewis Roumieu 
Anthony Salvin
John Dando Sedding
George Gilbert Scott
Giles Gilbert Scott
Edmund Sharpe
Imre Steindl
Josef Stenbäck  
George Edmund Street 
William Strickland
Rev Frederick Thatcher
Richard Upjohn
Henry Hill Vale
Henry Vaughan
Eugène Viollet-le-Duc
 Friedrich von Schmidt
William Wardell
Alfred Waterhouse
William White
Frank Wills
Benjamin Woodward
Thomas Worthington
William Wailes

Gothic Revival architects